McBean Cottage is a historic cure cottage located at Saranac Lake in the town of Harrietstown, Franklin County, New York.  It was built between 1915 and 1925  and is a -story, wood-frame structure on a fieldstone foundation.  It is topped by a hipped roof with two hip-roofed dormers in the Colonial Revival style.  It has American Craftsman details such as a cobblestone chimney, flared eaves, and wide overhangs with exposed rafters. It features two cure porches and a second-story sleeping porch.

It was listed on the National Register of Historic Places in 1992.

References

Houses on the National Register of Historic Places in New York (state)
Colonial Revival architecture in New York (state)
Houses completed in 1920
Houses in Franklin County, New York
National Register of Historic Places in Franklin County, New York